Pevidém is a village in the municipality of Guimarães, province Minho, Portugal.

References 

Villages in Portugal
Guimarães